Sadi Tekelioğlu (born 15 January 1955) is a Turkish football manager.

References

1955 births
Living people
Turkish football managers
Gençlerbirliği S.K. managers
Konyaspor managers
Trabzonspor managers
Akçaabat Sebatspor managers
Sakaryaspor managers
Kocaelispor managers
Türk Telekom GSK managers
Adana Demirspor managers
Sarıyer S.K. managers